The 1917 Far Eastern Championship Games was the third edition of the regional multi-sport event, contested between China, Japan and the Philippines, and was held from 8–12 May 1917 in Tokyo, Empire of Japan. A total of eight sports were contested, following the dropping of cycling from the programme after the 1915 games.

In the football competition, China was represented by South China AA, a Hong Kong-based team, while Japan was represented by a team from the Tokyo Higher Normal School.

Japan was the overall champion of the Games following the Philippines, and China.

Participating nations

Sports

References

Results
Football tournament

Far Eastern Championship Games
Far Eastern Championship Games
Far Eastern Championship Games
Far Eastern Championship Games
International sports competitions hosted by Japan
Multi-sport events in Japan
Far Eastern Championship Games
Sports competitions in Tokyo
1910s in Tokyo